Ronald Fields (January 11, 1968 – September 4, 2001), better known by his stage name Cougnut, was an American rapper from the Lakeview neighborhood of San Francisco, California.

Biography
As frontman of rap group Ill Mannered Posse (I.M.P), and later as solo artist, Fields was known for his dark raspy voice and street credibility. His best known release as a member of I.M.P. is probably the 1996 album Ill Mannered Playas, which was released through In-A-Minute Records.
Often requested for compilations and features, Fields was one of the most prominent rappers in the Bay Area in his prime (from 1993 until his death in 2001). Notable artists Fields worked with JT The Bigga Figga, Master P, Andre Nickatina, Da'unda'dogg, Sean T, and RBL Posse.

On September 4, 2001, Fields was killed in a car accident in Northern California.

Discography

Solo albums
 Unreleased

with I.M.P.
 I.M.P. Dogs (1990)
 Back in the Days (1993)
 Ill Mannered Playas (1996)

Guest appearances
 1993 – Trying To Survive In The Ghetto (by Herm)                
 1995 - " Animosity " Su-Side Records
 1995 – Dwellin' in tha Labb (with JT The Bigga Figga)
 1995 – Iceland (with Cold World Hustlers)
 1995 – I Hate You With a Passion (with Dre Dog)
 1996 - Ounce of Game (with Two-Illeven)
 1997 – West Coast Bad Boyz, Vol. 1: Anotha Level of the Game
 1997 – Notorious Pimps Playas & Hustlas
 1997 – Cloud Nine Production's Fattest James Volume 1
 1997 – Southwest Riders
 1998 – Bayriderz
 1998 – 50/50 Chances
 1998 – 17 Reasons
 1998 – Million Dollar Dream: This Is How We Lay Low
 1998 – 4080 Magazine Compilation II: Bay Luv
 1998 – 4080 Magazine Compilation III: The Twomp Sack
 1998 – Isolated in the Game (BayWay Records)
 1998 - "Heaven or Hell"  (with Kung Fu Vampire)
 1999 – Million Dollar Dream: Money & Muscle
 1999 – The Soundtrack (by Apt.3)
 2001 – Bay Area Playas 3
 2002 – Theme Music To Drug Dealins & Killins (by Apt.3/DNA)
 2005 – Known Associates 2 (by Apt.3/DNA Ent & Apt 4)
 2005 - Rip Love (by Guce & Road)

References

External links
 Discography at discogs.com
 [ IMP Discography at allmusic.com]
 [ Cougnut song credits at allmusic.com]

Rappers from the San Francisco Bay Area
African-American rappers
1968 births
2001 deaths
Horrorcore artists
Road incident deaths in California
Hip hop musicians from San Francisco
People from South San Francisco, California
Gangsta rappers
20th-century African-American people